Primera División de México (Mexican First Division) Apertura 2007 is a Mexican football tournament - one of two shorter tournaments that together make up the Mexican football season - to determine the champion(s) of Mexican football. It began on Friday, August 3, 2007. On June 10, 2007, FMF General Secretary Decio de Maria revealed the groups for the upcoming tournament. Reigning champions Pachuca were eliminated in Repechaje by Cruz Azul by a double leg aggragate score of 6-0 (0-2 in the first leg, 4-0 in the second leg) and thus could not retain their title. Puebla was promoted to the Primera División de México after they beat Sinaloa in the ascension final thus, Querétaro was relegated to the Primera División A. This is the first time they are taking part in a Primera División tournament since they were relegated after Clausura 2005. Atlante made the move to Cancún, Quintana Roo, and played in the Estadio Andrés Quintana Roo after having played in Estádio Azteca for over a decade. At their new home, on December 9, 2007 Atlante won the Apertura 2007 by defeating UNAM 2–1 on aggregate. It was Atlante's third title.

Overview

Final standings (groups)

League table

Top goalscorers 
Players sorted first by goals scored, then by last name. Only regular season goals listed.

Source: MedioTiempo

Results table

Playoffs

Repechage

Cruz Azul won 6–0 on aggregate.

Morelia won 3–1 on aggregate.

Bracket

Quarterfinals

Atlante won 3–1 on aggregate.

Guadalajara won 2–1 on aggregate.

Santos Laguna won 5–2 on aggregate.

UNAM won 3–1 on aggregate.

Semifinals

1–1 on aggregate. Atlante advanced for being the higher seeded team.

UNAM won 5–4 on aggregate.

Finals

Atlante won 2–1 on aggregate.

By winning Apertura 2007, Atlante earned a quarterfinal spot in the 2008 CONCACAF Champions' Cup, along with a berth in the 2008–09 CONCACAF Champions League Group Stage.

By being the Apertura 2007 runner-up, the Pumas earned a berth in the 2008–09 CONCACAF Champions League Preliminary Round.

External links
 MedioTiempo.com (where information was obtained)

Mexico
Apertura